Love Is is the second album released by American country music artist Kevin Sharp. The only single released from the album, "If She Only Knew", failed to reach the top 40 in the charts while the album itself reached number 36 on the Billboard Top Country Albums chart. "Her Heart Is Only Human" was originally recorded by Ty Herndon on his 1996 album Living in a Moment.

Track listing
"Kiss the Girl" (Bob Regan, George Teren) - 3:04
"We Can Get Through This" (Kim Carnes, Jeffrey Steele) - 2:55
"If She Only Knew" (Gordon Chambers, Chris Farren) - 5:00
"She Just Had to Be Mine" (Gary Burr, Farren) - 3:18
"Still Love" (Skip Ewing, Farren, Kevin Sharp) - 4:20
"I'm Trying" (Darrell Scott, Tia Sillers) - 4:01
"Typical" (Regan, Teren) - 3:15
"What Other Man" (Linda Thompson-Jenner, Reed Vertelney)  - 3:57
"So Tears Won't Fall" (Burr, Bruce Roberts) - 3:41
"Scared Like That Again" (Michael Dulaney, Farren) - 4:40
"Her Heart Is Only Human" (Kent Blazy, Steve Dorff, Kim Williams) - 3:31

Personnel
As listed in liner notes
Tim Buppert - background vocals
Mark Casstevens - electric guitar, acoustic guitar
Joe Chemay - bass guitar
Dan Dugmore - steel guitar
Chris Farren - background vocals, acoustic guitar, mandolin, electric guitar, keyboards
Pat Flynn - acoustic guitar
Larry Franklin - fiddle
Paul Franklin - steel guitar
Rob Hajacos - fiddle
John Hobbs - piano
Dann Huff - electric guitar
David Hungate - bass guitar
Jeff King - electric guitar
Mark Leggett - drum programming 
Paul Leim - drums
Sam Levine - penny whistle
Glenn Miller - background vocals
Greg Morrow - percussion
Steve Nathan - piano
Cary Park - electric guitar
Tom Roady - percussion
Matt Rollings - piano
Brent Rowan - electric guitar
Kevin Sharp - lead vocals
Jeffrey Steele - background vocals
Biff Watson - acoustic guitar
Dennis Wilson - background vocals

Chart performance

Sources

1998 albums
Asylum Records albums
Kevin Sharp albums
Albums produced by David Foster
Albums produced by Chris Farren (country musician)